The 2017 Finali Mondiali was the 2017 edition of the season-ending event for all Ferrari Challenge championships. Held at the Mugello Circuit in Italy as part of the biennial event contracting, the event saw drivers from the Asia-Pacific, European and North American championships take part.

This is the last year in which a 458 Challenge race was held, and would be replaced in 2018 with a Coppa Shell Pro-Am race.

Classification

Trofeo Pirelli

Coppa Shell

458 Challenge

See also
2017 Ferrari Challenge Europe

References

Finali 2017
Finali Mondiali
Finali Mondiali